The National Textile University (NTU) is a public university located in Faisalabad, Punjab, Pakistan. It is a premier institute of textile education in Pakistan.

Overview

Accreditations
National Textile University is accredited by the Pakistan Engineering Council (PEC) and National Technology Council (Pakistan) (NTC) and recognized by the Higher Education Commission of Pakistan (HEC) National Business Education Accreditation Council (NBEAC).

History
The idea of establishing a Textile Institute of world fame was conceived by a group of visionary industrialists in 1954. To realise this idea the Government of Punjab joined hands with the leading textile industrialists to form an Institute of Textile Technology in Faisalabad (then Lyallpur) and provided sixty-two acres of state owned land free of cost. Kohinoor Industries, Colony Textile Mills, The Dawood Foundation and Lyallpur Cotton Mills provided funds to the tune of Rs.2.5 millions, which were utilised for the construction of building and provision of other infrastructure. The Government of U.K. provided the bulk of equipment and machinery, along with the services of experts under the Colombo Plan. General Muhammad Ayub Khan, the then President of Pakistan, laid the foundation stone of the Institute, on the 12th of October 1959.

A Board of Trustees, with the Minister of Industries as chairman and nominees of the donor companies as members was constituted to manage the affairs of the Institute. In order to meet the recurring expenses of the Institute, a cess was levied by the government on the Textile industry of Pakistan. Later, in 1965, the Institute was granted affiliation by the University of Engineering and Technology, Lahore, and it was renamed as “National College of Textile Engineering”. The first batch of graduate engineers was passed out in 1966. In 1973, the administrative control of the Institute was transferred to the Federal Government and it was renamed as “National College of Textile Engineering”.

In 1992, the college received a comprehensive assistance worth 650 million yen from the Japanese Government, through JICA program, in the form of latest machinery and equipment for all the departments of the Institution. The college was upgraded as National Textile University on 15 November 2002 through promulgation of Ordinance No. CXXIV of 2002 by the President of Islamic Republic of Pakistan.

Ever since its inception, National Textile University has been the premier Institute of textile education in the country, meeting the technical and managerial human resource needs of almost entire textile industry of Pakistan. It always retained a close relationship with the industry and the industrialists of Pakistan.

Faculties

School of Engineering and Technology 
 Department of Textile Engineering
 Department of Textile Engineering Technology
 Department of Polymer Engineering
 Department of Apparel Manufacturing.

School of Art and design 
Bachelor of Textile Design
Bachelor of Fashion Design
Bachelor of Visual Arts
Bachelor of Multimedia & Animation Design

School of Sciences 
 Department of Computer Science
 Department of Applied Sciences

Faisalabad Business School 
 Department of Management Sciences
 BBA (Bachelor of Business Administrations)
 BSTMM
 BSTAM
 BSQ&C
 BSA&F
 MBA (1.5 Years)
 MBA (2 Years)
 MSBA
 PhD Management Sciences

Degree programs 
The disciplines and the degree programs offered by the university are given below. The regular duration of BS and MS/M Phil degree programs is four and two years, respectively.

Departmental societies 
 Society of Textile Spinners
 Society of Textile Chemist
 Garment Society
 Knitting Society
 Society of Textile Weavers
 Computer Science Society
 Textile Design Society
 Fashion Design Society
 Textile Management Society
 Executive Society
 Society of Polymer Engineering
 Society of Textile Technology

Other societies 
 Blood Donation Society
 NTU Community Services
 Technical Textile Society
 Arts and Culture Society
 Debating Club
 The Quran Society 
 Literary Society
 NTU News Latter
 ASAA
 Character Building Societies
 NTU Iqbal Society (IQS)

See also
List of universities in Pakistan
List of engineering universities in Pakistan
Textile Institute of Pakistan, Karachi

References

External links
NTU official website

Universities and colleges in Faisalabad District
Textile industry of Pakistan
1959 establishments in Pakistan
Educational institutions established in 1959
Public universities and colleges in Punjab, Pakistan
Faisalabad
Engineering universities and colleges in Pakistan